Özgür Baran Aksaka (Bulgarian: Йозгюр Баран Аксака; born 29 January 2003) is an footballer who plays as a midfielder for Galatasaray.

Club career
Aksaka was born Tekirdağ, Turkey in a family of a Turkish father and Bulgarian-Turkish mother.  Starting playing at age of 8, he joined Galatasaray academy in 2013. He made his debut for the first team on 19 October 2022 in a Turkish Cup match against Kastamonuspor. On 17 January 2023, Galatasaray extended his contract until the summer of 2026. He completed his professional debut on 4 January 2023 in a league match against Ankaragücü.

International career
Aksaka holds dual citizenship making him available for both Turkey and Bulgaria. In December 2022 it was reported that he received a call-up for Bulgaria U21 which he accepted.A few days later Tolunay Kafkas expressed the desire to call Aksaka in the Turkey U21. In interview on 2 February 2023, Aleksandar Dimitrov, manager of Bulgaria U21, confirmed he personally spoke with Aksaka for representing the team in the qualifications for European Under-21 Championship starting from March 2023.

Career statistics

Club

References

External links
 

2003 births
Living people
People from Tekirdağ
Turkish footballers
Turkish people of Bulgarian descent
Galatasaray S.K. footballers
Süper Lig players
Association football midfielders